Robert Fleisher (born 1953 in New York City) is a composer and Professor Emeritus at Northern Illinois University and the author of Twenty Israeli Composers, where he discusses with  twenty Israeli composers about their inspirations, methods and cultural context in their work. He is also a contributing composer and essayist in Theresa Sauer’s Notations 21 (2009).  Robert Fleisher's work has also been in 60x60's Crimson Mix

Articles and Reviews
The Inside Story: Robert Fleisher and MOTO FINALE Navona Records - January 27, 2022
Where Composers Lend Their Voices By Allan Kozinn, New York Times - June 17, 2010

Discography
Moto Finale Navona Records - Release Date: December 10, 2021
Moto Continuo  Navona Records - Release Date: July 10, 2015

Publications
 Twenty Israeli Composers: Voices of a Culture By Robert Fleisher Published by Wayne State University Press  1997
 Notations 21 by Theresa Sauer Published by Mark Batty Publisher, New York 2008

References

External links
 Robert Fleisher's Biography on Vox Novus

American male classical composers
American classical composers
20th-century classical composers
21st-century classical composers
Living people
Northern Illinois University faculty
Place of birth missing (living people)
1953 births
21st-century American composers
Experimental Music Studios alumni
20th-century American composers
20th-century American male musicians
21st-century American male musicians
Centaur Records artists